Gonzalo Norberto Pavone (born 14 June 1977) is an Argentine retired footballer who played as a striker.

Club career
Born in Tres Sargentos, Buenos Aires Province, Pavone made his senior debut in the 1997–98 season, appearing in seven scoreless games for Estudiantes de La Plata, after which he represented three teams in quick succession. Starting in the early 2000s and during one year, he played amateur football in Italy.

After a spell with Independiente Rivadavia in the Primera B Nacional, Pavone moved abroad again, joining CF Extremadura from Spain. He would remain in the country for the vast majority of the following seven years (safe for one season back in his homeland with All Boys), never competing in higher than Segunda División B.

Following the 2009–10 campaign in Tercera División, the 33-year-old Pavone was released by CD Don Benito where he had arrived on 31 January 2009. He returned to his country subsequently, playing exclusively at amateur level.

Personal life
Pavone's younger brother, Mariano, was also a footballer and a striker. He too represented Estudiantes – with much more individual success – also playing abroad with Real Betis.

References

External links
 

1977 births
Living people
Sportspeople from Buenos Aires Province
Argentine footballers
Association football forwards
Argentine Primera División players
Primera Nacional players
Estudiantes de La Plata footballers
Defensa y Justicia footballers
Club Atlético Banfield footballers
Arsenal de Sarandí footballers
Independiente Rivadavia footballers
All Boys footballers
A.S. Lodigiani players
Segunda División B players
Tercera División players
CF Extremadura footballers
SD Ponferradina players
Logroñés CF footballers
Alicante CF footballers
CD Puertollano footballers
Argentine expatriate footballers
Expatriate footballers in Italy
Expatriate footballers in Spain
Argentine expatriate sportspeople in Italy
Argentine expatriate sportspeople in Spain